is a Japanese curler.

Teams

References

External links

Living people
1993 births
Sportspeople from Tokyo
Japanese male curlers